A Picnic biscuit is a type of biscuit. It is small and rectangle-shaped.

Mass production 
In Turkey, the biscuit is mass produced by Ülker, Eti, Azra, Hazal, Anı. In Romania, the biscuit is mass produced by Rostar, Arslan Bifa

See also
 Rich Tea
 List of cookies

References 

Biscuits